Richard "Rick" Paul Springer (c. 1951 – 2010) was an American anti-nuclear activist.  He was best known for his arrest after smashing a crystal statue in front of former President Ronald Reagan at a luncheon in 1992, and his subsequent imprisonment on various charges.

Biography
Early in life Richard Springer worked as a carpenter, a youth counselor, and a merchant mariner. 

In the early 1990s Springer founded The Hundredth Monkey Project, what he hoped would be a "massive set of concerts and demonstrations" bringing together anti-nuclear activists. The effort never fully materialized; however, on the weekend of April 10 to 12, 1992, a more modest gathering of 2,000 people assembled in the desert near the Nevada Test Site for a series of music and speeches organized by Springer. On April 13, many participants traveled to Las Vegas for a demonstration at a U.S. Department of Energy office, during which 24 people were arrested. The same day, Springer walked onto the stage of a National Association of Broadcasters luncheon in Las Vegas, Nevada, while former President of the United States Ronald Reagan was addressing the attendees. On stage, Springer smashed a 30-pound crystal statue that had earlier been presented to Reagan and then attempted to commandeer the microphone into which Reagan was speaking. He was quickly swarmed by special agents of the United States Secret Service and dragged off-stage. Springer had accessed the luncheon using a press credential issued by Indian Voices, a Native American affairs newsletter. At the time, the Secret Service did not have a policy of examining the press credentials of persons attending appearances by former presidents. 

Springer was arraigned and released on his own recognizance pending trial. The following week he was interviewed by CBS This Morning about the incident, and explained that he was hoping to raise awareness about the dangers of nuclear testing. In the interview, Springer went on to say, "I certainly must offer an apology to Mr. Reagan", explaining that he was committed to non-violence and regretted any concern he had caused for Reagan's safety.

The following February, Springer pled guilty to a misdemeanor charge of interference with the Secret Service. Springer was due to surrender himself to begin serving a four-month jail sentence over the incident on June 2, 1993. Instead, however, he sent a fax to a Nevada television station saying he would not surrender himself to authorities until the United States government began adhering to all treaties "calling for the cessation of all nuclear weapons tests in all atmospheres for all time". Springer also sent a letter to the U.S. District Court for the District of Nevada denouncing the United States as an "oppressor nation" and alleging mistreatment of the Shoshone. Five days later an arrest warrant was issued for Springer. 

Springer was apprehended two months later and charged with Failure to Surrender. In his subsequent trial, he pled not guilty, stating that a higher moral law required he continue anti-nuclear activism rather than go to prison. His first trial on the new charges resulted in a hung jury; however, he was convicted on a second attempt and sentenced to prison, being released in 1995. 

In 1997 Springer published a book, Excuse Me, Mr. President: The Message of the Broken Eagle.

After his release from prison, Springer lived for a time in Arcata, California with artist Carol Andersen and her two children. Andersen's children later reported that Springer was abusive and an alcoholic. In later years, Springer lived on a ranch in Gerlach, Nevada. He died two weeks after his 2010 wedding of an apparent self-inflicted gunshot wound.

See also
 Comprehensive Nuclear-Test-Ban Treaty

References

External links
 video of the Reagan incident (YouTube)

American anti–nuclear power activists
2010 deaths
1950s births
Suicides by firearm in Nevada